The 1975–76 Minnesota Golden Gophers men's ice hockey team represented the University of Minnesota in college ice hockey. In its 4th year under head coach Herb Brooks the team compiled a 28–14–2 record and reached the NCAA tournament for the third consecutive year and seventh all-time. The Golden Gophers defeated Michigan Tech 6–4 in the championship game at the DU Arena in Denver, Colorado to win their second national championship.

Season

Fast start
After a disappointing end to what was otherwise a tremendous season, Minnesota entered the 1975–76 campaign with a fairly young team. Herb Brooks' squad had only two seniors and four juniors leaving the team rather shorthanded in terms of experience. The Gophers' didn't let their youth stand in the way of a fast start, however. Minnesota won their first game in October over the US National Team which kicked off a 5-game winning streak. The Gophers suffered their first loss in their first true road game of the season when they were beaten by Denver in overtime. While Minnesota recovered to earn a split for the weekend, that series was the start of a 10-game trend where they alternated wins and losses. At the end of December Minnesota finally stopped losing every weekend and put together another 5-game winning streak to push their record to 14–5.

New Year and .500 hockey
The Gophers began 1976 with a series against the defending national champions, Michigan Tech and while they split the series, the two teams combined for 25 goals in the two games. Minnesota then took seven out of eight points against Notre Dame and Denver before visiting Michigan and dropping both contest to the surprisingly strong Wolverines. After two more wins at Minnesota–Duluth the Gophers lost two more Big Ten contests, this time to Michigan State. Two losses dropped Minnesota's Big Ten record to 2–6 though they were still well positioned with a 19–10–1 mark in the WCHA. The following weekend the Gophers split with Wisconsin to guarantee that they would finish with a losing record in the Big Ten and continued to split each weekend for the remaining 4 weeks of the regular season.

WCHA tournament
Despite their mediocre finish, Minnesota managed to hold onto home ice for the first round of the WCHA tournament and played host to Colorado College. The Gopher defense stepped up in the first game and gave Minnesota a 4-goal margin of victory that allowed the team to cruise to a 10–5 series win after taking the second contest. Minnesota was forced to hit the road for the second round, heading to Michigan State and facing off against the nation's leading scorer in Tom Ross. Minnesota was able to hold the Spartan offence to only two goals in the first game but could only manage two itself and the match ended in a 2-2 tie. both offenses woke up for the deciding second game and managed to score six times in regulation. Overtime was played at the same high pace but the goaltenders turned aside everything that came their way for over 40 minutes before Minnesota broke the tie and captured their third straight WCHA championship. Jeff Tscherne recorded 72 saves in the win, a Minnesota team record as of 2018.

NCAA tournament
As they had two years earlier, Minnesota opened as the underdog against ECAC champion Boston University and just like 1974 the Gophers were able to send the Terriers packing. In the championship game Minnesota met Michigan Tech for the third consecutive year, the only time in NCAA where the same two team made the final three years running (as of 2019). The defending champion Huskies had produced a stellar season thus far and had already set a new NCAA record with 34 wins on the season. The top offense in the nation was led by future NHL-er Mike Zuke who had posted 103 points on the season and was only two behind Tom Ross for the scoring title. It didn't take much time from the start of the contest to figure out that it was not Jeff Tscherne's night. Michigan Tech scored three times in under four minutes to build a huge lead less than twelve minutes into the contest. Tscherne remained in net for the rest of the period and was able to stem the tide but it was a power play goal from Tom Vannelli at the end of the first that gave Minnesota some breathing room. Tscherne was replaced by Tom Mohr from the second on and the junior netminder was given time to settle in when Minnesota opened an offensive salvo on the Michigan Tech net. The Gophers outshot the Huskies 16–3 in the second and scored three times to erase the Tech advantage and take the lead themselves. Michigan Tech halted the Gopher charge with their fourth goal that came with 36 seconds to play to send the teams into the final frame in a tied game. The play was much more even in the third but Minnesota managed to score first with team captain Pat Phippen's goal near the middle of the stanza. Mohr held the Huskies off the scoresheet and allowed Warren Miller to cap the scoring with 30 seconds left.

Minnesota's second championship in three years was even more improbable that their first and the 1976 Golden Gophers became the first team since the 1948–49 Boston College Eagles to have a national champion composed entirely of American players. Furthermore, with Jim Boo having been raised in Minnesota they were the second team to have all of their players hail from one state.

Tom Vannelli's 5 points in the title tile earned him the Tournament MOP, however, for the only time in its history the NCAA did not name an All-Tournament Team. No Minnesota players were named to the AHCA All-American West Team and only Reed Larson made an appearance on an All-WCHA Team, earning first-team honors.

Three Minnesota players were taken at the 1976 NHL Amateur Draft. Reed Larson went on to have a very successful NHL career, becoming a three-time NHL All-Star.

Standings

Schedule

|-
!colspan=12 style="color:white; background:#862334; " | Regular Season

|-
!colspan=12 style="color:white; background:#862334; " | 

|- align="center" bgcolor="#e0e0e0"
|colspan=12|Minnesota Wins Series 12-5

|- align="center" bgcolor="#e0e0e0"
|colspan=12|Minnesota Wins Series 9-8
|-
!colspan=12 style="color:white; background:#862334; " |

Roster and scoring statistics

Goaltending statistics

1976 championship game

(W1) Michigan Tech vs. (W2) Minnesota

Players drafted into the NHL/WHA

1976 NHL Amateur Draft

1976 WHA Amateur Draft

References

Minnesota Golden Gophers men's ice hockey seasons
Minnesota
Minnesota
Minnesota
Minnesota
Minnesota
Minnesota